Great Britain national field hockey team may refer to:
 Great Britain men's national field hockey team
 Great Britain women's national field hockey team